Damat Mehmed Ali Pasha (1813–1868) was an Ottoman statesman and diplomat. He served as the Grand Vizier from October 3, 1852, to May 14, 1853, on the eve of the Crimean War. Along with Fuad Pasha, Mehmed Emin Âli Pasha and Mustafa Reşid Pasha, he was one of the main reformers of the Tanzimat period.

Early life and career
Mehmed Ali Pasha was born in 1813 in Hemşin, a city along the Black Sea coast in modern Turkey, and was of ethnic Hemshin descent. His father was Hacı Ömer Agha. His grandfather, Hacı Ali Agha, was a hazelnut dealer. It was while accompanying his father to Istanbul that Mehmed Ali Pasha opened to himself the doors of a brilliant career. His father was appointed Galata Başağası, or head functionary of the imperial palace of Galata. Mehmed Ali was hired by Ahmed Pasha Pabuççuzâde, grand admiral of the Ottoman fleet from 1828 to 1840. Mehmed Ali made his career in the Palace, which led him to occupy, among others, the
function of grand admiral five times between 1845-1847, 1848–1849, 1851-1852, 1855–1858, and 1858–1863. Between 1849–1851, and 1853–1854, he served as serasker. Between 1852-1853, he served as grand vizier.

Personal life
Mehmet Ali Pasha had a brother Mehmed Bey, and a sister Fatma Hanım, who married Mehmed Cemil Pasha, son of grand vizier Mustafa Reşid Pasha.

His first wife was Saliha Hanım. With her, he had a son Mahmud Edhem Pasha. Edhem married Refia Sultan, daughter of Sultan Abdulmejid I and Gülcemal Kadın on 23 April 1857. After her death in 1880, he married Fatma Nazlı Hanım. With her, he had a son, Mehmed Ali Bey, who died on 6 October 1887. Edhem died on 7 February 1886.

His second wife was Adile Sultan, daughter of Sultan Mahmud II and Zernigâr Hanım. They married on 23 April 1845. The two together had four children, Hayriye Hanımsultan, Sultanzade Isma'il Bey, Sıdıka Hanımsultan, Aliye Hanımsultan. His third wife was Nevkevser Hanım. With her he had a daughter, Hatice Hanım, who married Cemal Bey.

See also
 List of Ottoman Grand Viziers

References

Further reading

1813 births
1868 deaths
19th-century Grand Viziers of the Ottoman Empire
Turkish people of Hemshin descent
Ambassadors of the Ottoman Empire to the United Kingdom
19th-century diplomats
Damats